Amy Wong is a Hong Kong television drama producer. She worked for RTV and ATV before moving to TVB in 1989. Wong is known for her collaborations with Kevin Cheng and Ruco Chan, in which her productions have boosted both actors to stardom.

Filmography

Frequent casting
Yvonne Ho – My Family, Under the Canopy of Love, The Seventh Day, Last One Standing, Burning Flame III, The Stew of Life, Only You, Last One Standing, No Good Either Way, Brother's Keeper
Kevin Cheng – Hard Fate, Yummy Yummy, Under the Canopy of Love, The Ultimate Crime Fighter, The Seventh Day, Last One Standing, Burning Flame III, Only You
Ruco Chan – Burning Flame III, Only You, The Other Truth, No Good Either Way, Ruse of Engagement, Brother's Keeper
Frankie Lam – The Change of Time, Romance Beyond, Before Dawn, On the Track or Off
Wong He – Food of Love, Burning Flame, Burning Flame II, Burning Flame III
Yoyo Mung – The Ultimate Crime Fighter, Last One Standing, Only You, Ruse of Engagement
Niki Chow – Hard Fate, Under the Canopy of Love, The Seventh Day
Kristal Tin – Only You, The Other Truth, No Good Either Way, Brother's Keeper
Louise Lee – The Stew of Life, Only You,  The Other Truth, Ruse of Engagement, Brother's Keeper
Louis Yuen – The Other Truth, No Good Either Way, Brother's Keeper

References

TVB producers
Living people
Year of birth missing (living people)